Harvest mouse may refer to members of two groups of rodents:
Micromys from Eurasia
 particularly the Eurasian harvest mouse, Micromys minutus
Reithrodontomys from the Americas

Animal common name disambiguation pages